The Shadow Play (Chinese: 风中有朵雨做的云; literally There's cloud made from rain in the wind) is a 2018 Chinese crime drama film directed by Lou Ye. It made its world premiere at the 58th Taipei Golden Horse Film Festival in 2018. The film was also shown in the Panorama section at the 69th Berlin International Film Festival. It was released theatrically on April 4, 2019 in China.

Synopsis
Yang Jiadong, a naive rookie cop, witnesses the Chief of Construction Committee jumping to his death from a tall building. He immediately begins investigation, but was brutally dismissed from his job and pursued by unknown enemies. He escapes to Hong Kong, where meets the daughter of the deceased victim. With the help of Xiao Ruo, Yang Jiadong continues to seek for the truth, but finds himself falling into an entrapment of love.

Cast 
Jing Boran as Yang Jiadong
Ma Sichun as Xiao Ruo 
 Sun Chenxi as Xiao Ruo (10-year-old)
 Huang Kailu as Xiao Ruo (15-year-old)
Song Jia as Lin Hui
Qin Hao as Jiang Zicheng
Michelle Chen as Lian Ahyun 
Zhang Songwen as Tang Yijie
Edison Chen as Alex
 Cherry Ngan as bar girl
 Wang Weishen as Wang
 Shan Baozhong as Sun
 Leung Chi-lik as Chun
 Chen Weirong as Mr. Yang
 Luo Yimin as Stuntman
 Hu Ling as Ms Hu
 Herman Lau as Businessman

Awards and nominations

References

External links
 

2018 films
Chinese crime drama films
Chinese mystery films
Films directed by Lou Ye
Films scored by Jóhann Jóhannsson
Films set in Guangzhou
Films shot in Guangzhou
Films shot in Taiwan
Films shot in Hong Kong